Chelecala is a monotypic moth genus of the family Noctuidae erected by George Hampson in 1913. Its only species, Chelecala trefoliata, was first described by Arthur Gardiner Butler in 1898. It is found in Kenya.

References

Endemic moths of Kenya
Catocalinae